Karumba is a town and a coastal locality in the Shire of Carpentaria, Queensland, Australia.

Geography 
Karumba is within the Shire of Carpentaria, the administrative headquarters of which is in Normanton. The town is sited at the mouth of the Norman River, and enjoys the distinction of being the only town along the southern Gulf of Carpentaria that is within sight of the Gulf itself (the Gulf's extensive tidal flats prohibits settlement elsewhere along its shore).

The rare Morning Glory cloud rolls through Karumba in the early hours of some mornings in September and October.

Karumba Airport is on Fielding Street. There are no regular commercial services from this airport; the nearest regular services are available at Normanton Airport.

History 
The settlement was previously known as Norman Mouth and Kimberley. The toponym derives from the Kareldi    native name, Kurumba, who were the indigenous landholders of this area before the onset of white colonization and expropriation. This name was officially used for the township by the 1880s.

Karumba Post Office opened on 22 August 1889 and closed in 1919.

Given its access to the Gulf of Carpentaria, the town's economy has revolved largely around fishing. The prawn industry expanded in the 1960s.

In the late 1930s, the town was a refueling and maintenance stop for the flying boats of the Qantas Empire Airways. No. 43 Squadron of the RAAF also operated Consolidated PBY Catalina flying boats from the town between June 1943 and April 1944.

Karumba State School opened in September 1968.

Regular services by the Uniting Church in Australia are held in the Community Church. These are provided by the  McKay Patrol, an aerial service of the Uniting Church in Australia that operates out of Cloncurry.

Karumba Public Library was opened in 1979.

The region is repeatedly mentioned in the song "Every Passing Day" by Australian band Goanna on their album Oceania.

The Red Hot Chili Peppers' song "Animal Bar" from their 2006 album Stadium Arcadium is about Karumba. It is named after a bar called the Animal Bar.

Economy 
The Karumba port services the Century Zinc Mine as well as fishing industry.

The prawning industry makes an important economic contribution to the town.

Education
Karumba State School is a government primary (Prep-6) school for boys and girls at 5 Yappar Street. In 2018, the school had an enrolment of 28 students with 3 teachers and 7 non-teaching staff (4 full-time equivalent).

There are no secondary schools in Karumba. The nearest government secondary school is Normanton State School (to Year 10) in neighbouring Normanton to the south. There are no schools offering secondary education to Year 12 in Karumba or nearby; the options are distance education or boarding school.

Amenities

Karumba has a public library in Walker Street, visitor information centre, parks, bowls club, golf course, swimming pool, and a sports centre.

The Carpentaria Shire Council operates a public library at Walker Street.

St James' and St John's Community Church at 59 Yappar Street is shared by the Anglican, Catholic and Uniting congregations. It is within the Gulf Savannah Parish of the Roman Catholic Diocese of Cairns.

Regular services by the Uniting Church in Australia are held in the Community Church. These are provided by the  McKay Patrol, an aerial service of the Uniting Church in Australia that operates out of Cloncurry.

Climate
Karumba has a tropical savanna climate (Köppen Aw) with two distinct seasons. The “Wet” usually lasts from December to March and is extremely hot and humid, with wet bulb temperatures typically above  during the afternoons. Most roads during the “Wet” are usually closed by heavy rain, which can exceed  in a day due to the passage of tropical cyclones or monsoonal depressions which provide most of the rain.

The “Dry” usually lasts from April to the middle of November and is much more comfortable due to lower humidity and milder morning temperatures. This period of the year is essentially bone dry and almost completely cloudless: median rainfall is nil between May and September and over twenty days each month are completely clear.

See also

 Karumba Airport

References

External links

University of Queensland: Queensland Places: Karumba
morningglorycloud.com has video of the Gulf of Carpentaria region  and the Morning Glory Cloud
Carpentaria Shire Council homepage
General information from the Sydney Morning Herald
Town map of Karumba, 1979

Towns in Queensland
Coastal towns in Queensland
North West Queensland
Gulf of Carpentaria
Shire of Carpentaria
Fishing communities in Australia
Localities in Queensland